Willy Borsus (born 4 April 1962) is a Belgian politician. He is a member of the Reformist Movement (MR). He was the 14th Minister-President of Wallonia from the 28th of July 2017 to the 13th of September 2019.

Political career 
Political mandates previously or currently held
 1988–present: Municipal Councillor of Somme-Leuze
 1995–present: Mayor of Somme-Leuze 
 1994-2004: Provincial Councillor of Namur
 1995-2000: President of the Provincial Council of Namur
 2000-2004: group leader the Provincial Council of Namur
 2004-2014: Walloon and French Community MP
 2008-2009: First Deputy Chairman of the Parliament of the French Community
 2009-2014: Group Leader in the Walloon Parliament
 2014–2017: Federal Minister for the Middle Classes, Independents, Small and Medium Enterprises, Agriculture and Social Integration in the Michel Government 
 2017-2019: Minister-President of Wallonia
 2019–present: Vice-President of Wallonia; Minister of Economy, Foreign Trade, Spatial Planning and Agriculture.

References 

Living people
1962 births
20th-century Belgian politicians
21st-century Belgian politicians
Ministers-President of Wallonia
Government ministers of Wallonia